Crinotonia attenuatus is a species of shrimp found in the Pacific and Indian Oceans. It was first named by A. J. Bruce in 1971, as Periclimenes attenuatus.

References

Palaemonoidea
Crustaceans described in 1971